, born on August 13, 1961 in Nagoya, Japan, is a Japanese theatre and film actor.

Biography 

He debuted as an extra in the series Chu-gaku-sei Nikki, and was later written into the script. He later gained notability while working with the theatrical troupe Tokyo Sunshine Boys, though he is not a member of the group. Kondo continues to work with the Tokyo Sunshine Boys leader and director Mitani Koki, however, in all of his movies after the troupe disbanded.

Now Kondo plays secondary roles in Japanese films.

Filmography

Film
 The Gentle Twelve (1991)
 Welcome Back, Mr. McDonald (1997)
 Minna no Ie (2001)
 Suite Hotel (2006)
 The Magic Hour (2008)
 The Kiyosu Conference (2013)
 Ringside Story (2017)
 Katsu Fūtarō!! (2019)
 Kamata Prelude (2020)
 Remain In Twilight (2021)
 The Supporting Actors: The Movie (2021), himself
 The Mukoda Barber Shop (2022)
 In Love and Deep Water (2023)

Television
 Furuhata Ninzaburō (1996, 2006)
 GTO (1998)
 Furin Kazan (2007), Aiki Ichibei
 4 Shimai Tantei Dan (2008)
 Gunshi Kanbei, (2014), Shibata Katsuie
 Sanada Maru (2016), Hirano Nagayasu
 Happy Marriage!? (2016), Satoru Mamiya
 Segodon (2018), Tanaka Yūnosuke
 Natsuzora (2019), Ken'ya Nogami
 Shiroi Kyotō (2019)
 The Supporting Actors 3 (2021), himself
 Reach Beyond the Blue Sky (2021), Kijūrō Shidehara
 Come Come Everybody (2021–22), Yōsuke Kogure
 Bakumatsu Aibō-den (2022), Sagawa Kanbei

References

External links
 

Living people
People from Nagoya
1961 births